The Villa Taylor is an historic residence in the Guéliz district of Marrakesh, Morocco. The villa was built in the early-20th century by Moses Taylor, grandson of the merchant and banker Moses Taylor, and occupied after Taylor's death in 1921 by his widow, Edith Bishop Taylor. During the Second World War, the house was requisitioned by the American Government to house its Vice-Consul, Kenneth Pendar. In January 1943, Pendar hosted Franklin D. Roosevelt and Winston Churchill at the villa, following the Casablanca Conference. While staying at the villa, Churchill painted Tower of the Koutoubia Mosque, the only picture he undertook during the war. In 1947 Mrs Taylor sold the house to the mother of Comte Charles de Breteuil, who gave it to her son and his wife as a wedding present. The villa was subsequently bought by King Hassan II in 1985, who intended the house as a home for the Moroccan Crown Prince. This plan was not taken forward and the villa was abandoned and suffered neglect.

History and description

The villa dates from the early 20th century. Sources vary as to whether it was built by Moses Taylor, or by his widow. At the outbreak of the Second World War, the house was requisitioned by the US Government, and Kenneth Pendar, an archaeologist, the US Vice-Consul and a secret agent was installed in residence. In January 1943, Franklin D. Roosevelt and Winston Churchill met at the Casablanca Conference, to determine the future direction of the war. At the conclusion of their summit, Churchill persuaded Roosevelt to undertake a short excursion to Marrakesh. Churchill had first visited the city in the winter of 1935-1936 and, despite initial reservations—“the crowds, the smells and the general discomfort for painting have repelled me”, he wrote—he stayed for three weeks and came to love the city he termed ‘The Paris of the Sahara’. He was determined that Roosevelt should share in his experiences. Roosevelt and Churchill were accommodated by Pendar at the Villa Taylor and, after experiencing the sunset from the villa's tower, enjoyed an evening of dinner and songs. After Roosevelt's departure the next day, Churchill remained at the villa, making plans for his travels and painting the Tower of the Koutoubia Mosque from the tower, the only picture he undertook during the war.

Personal recollections of the sojourn at the Villa Taylor were recorded by members of Churchill's staff, as well as by Churchill himself. Churchill’s aide-de-camp, Commander Thompson, recorded Villa Taylor as, “built in the local style with a central courtyard, orange trees and fountains, and the interior decoration was exotic in the extreme”. General Alan Brooke, Chief of the Imperial General Staff, and Churchill's main military adviser, described both the villa, and his master's appearance within it. The villa was "very ornate and Moroccan with a wonderful garden". Churchill was no less colourful; "It was all I could do to remain serious. The room must have been Mrs Taylor's bedroom and was all done up in Moorish style, the ceiling was a marvellous fresco of green, blue and gold. And there in the bed was Winston, in his green, red and gold dragon dressing gown, his hair, or what there was of it, standing on end, the lights shining on his cheeks, and a large cigar in his face!" Churchill's long-time bodyguard Walter Thompson wrote, rather more respectfully; "No more suitable place for Mr Churchill to be at his painting could be imagined, the whole scene was a riot of the colour from which he draws his inspiration". Churchill himself was greatly taken with his temporary home, which he described in a letter to his wife, as "a fairyland villa".

On reclaiming the Villa Taylor at the end of the war, Mrs Taylor promptly sold it, reputedly because, as a staunch Republican, she objected to the villa's use by the Democratic Roosevelt. The purchaser was the mother of Comte Charles de Breteuil, a newspaper publisher, and he and his wife, known as Boule, received the villa as a wedding present. After the death of her husband in 1960, the comtesse remained living at the house until her own death, on a lifetime lease having sold on the property to King Hassan II in the 1980s. The King originally planned to offer the house to his son, the Crown Prince, but these plans were not taken forward.

Notes

References

Sources
 
  
 
 
  
 
 
 
 
 
Buildings and structures in Marrakesh
Architecture in Morocco
Winston Churchill